The list of shipwrecks in June 1849 includes ships sunk, foundered, wrecked, grounded, or otherwise lost during June 1849.

1 June

2 June

4 June

5 June

6 June

7 June

8 June

9 June

10 June

11 June

12 June

13 June

14 June

15 June

16 June

17 June

18 June

19 June

20 June

21 June

22 June

23 June

24 June

25 June

26 June

27 June

28 June

29 June

30 June

Unknown date

References

1849-06